, also romanized as Jō-ō, was a Japanese era name (年号, nengō, lit. year name) after Jōkyū and before Gennin.  This period spanned the years from April 1222 to November 1224. The reigning emperor was Go-Horikawa-tennō.

Change of era
 1222 :  The era name was changed to Jōō (meaning "Righteous Answer") to mark an event or a number of events. The previous era ended and a new one commenced in Jōkyū, on the 13th day of the 4th month of 1222.

Events of the Jōō era
 1222 (Jōō 2):  Regulations established concerning salaries for Jitō
 July 19, 1223 (Jōō 2, 20th day of the 6th month):  The buildings of the Asama Shrine at the base of Mount Fuji in Suruga province  were re-built by Hōjō Tokimasa.

Notes

References
 Brown, Delmer and Ichiro Ishida. (1979). The Future and the Past: a translation and study of the 'Gukanshō', an interpretative history of Japan written in 1219.  Berkeley: University of California Press. ;  OCLC 5145872
 Ponsonby-Fane, Richard Arthur Brabazon. (1962).  Studies in Shinto and Shrines. Kyoto: Ponsonby Memorial Society. OCLC 3994492
 Nussbaum, Louis-Frédéric and Käthe Roth. (2005).  Japan encyclopedia. Cambridge: Harvard University Press. ;  OCLC 58053128
 Titsingh, Isaac. (1834). Nihon Odai Ichiran; ou,  Annales des empereurs du Japon.  Paris: Royal Asiatic Society, Oriental Translation Fund of Great Britain and Ireland. OCLC 5850691
 Varley, H. Paul. (1980). A Chronicle of Gods and Sovereigns: Jinnō Shōtōki of Kitabatake Chikafusa. New York: Columbia University Press. ;  OCLC 6042764

External links
 National Diet Library, "The Japanese Calendar" -- historical overview plus illustrative images from library's collection

Japanese eras
1220s in Japan